UATV is an acronym representing any of the following:

 Urban America Television, defunct television network in the United States
 United Artists Television, defunct television production and syndication arm of United Artists Pictures
 UATV, Ukrainian public broadcaster, operated by Ukrinform